The 2022 Euro Hand 4 All wass the first edition of the wheelchair handball tournament which was held in Pavilhão do Lis in the Écully (Lyon Metropolis), France from 1 to 2 July 2022.

Standings

Knockout stage

Third place game

Final

Final ranking

References

Website

 Site de FFHB

Wheelchair
International handball competitions hosted by France
Sport in Lyon Metropolis
Euro Hand 4 All